The Coup d'état of May Seventeenth was a military coup d'état carried out in South Korea by General Chun Doo-hwan and Hanahoe that followed the Coup d'état of December Twelfth.

On May 17, 1980, General Chun Doo-hwan forced the Cabinet to extend martial law to the whole nation, which had previously not applied to Jeju-do. The expanded martial law closed universities, banned political activities and further curtailed the press. To enforce the martial law, troops were dispatched to various parts of the nation. On the same day, the Korean Central Intelligence Agency (KCIA) raided a national conference of student union leaders from 55 universities. About 2,700 people, including twenty-six politicians, were also arrested. On May 18, 1980, citizens of Gwangju rose up against Chun Doo-hwan's military dictatorship and took control of the city. In the course of the uprising, citizens took up arms to defend themselves, but were ultimately crushed by the army (see Gwangju Uprising).

On May 20, 1980, Chun Doo-hwan and Roh Tae-woo ordered the National Assembly to be dissolved by deploying troops in the National Assembly. Chun subsequently created the National Defense Emergency Policy Committee, and installed himself as a member. On July 17, 1980, he resigned his position as KCIA director, and then held only the position of committee member. In September 1980, President Choi Kyu-hah was forced to resign as president to give way to the new military leader, Chun Doo-hwan.

Background 
On October 26, 1979, President Park Chung-hee was assassinated by the leader of the Korean Central Intelligence Agency (KCIA). Under Park Chung-hee, South Korea was an undemocratic and autocratic state. After his assassination, South Korea entered a state of transition, with attempts made to transform South Korea into a democratic nation. Despite these attempts, the Yushin Constitution was not abolished and military and authoritarian rule remained in place.

Choi Kyu-hah, who was the prime minister at the time, was appointed acting president to succeed Park Chung-hee. With Choi Kyu-hah in power, restrictive regulations under Park Chung-hee were repealed and opposition leaders and activists, such as Kim Dae-jung, were freed from restraint. Choi Kyu-hah later became the official president of South Korea on December 6, 1979.

Army General Chun Doo-hwan, the head of the Military Security Command, was appointed to investigate the assassination of Park Chung-hee. During this time Chun Doo-hwan found opportunities to seize power. Chun Doo-hwan took control of the Republic of Korea army (ROK Army) on December 12, 1979, after he arrested Jung Seung-hwa, chief of staff of the Korean army and the commander of martial law, in addition to the other forces that would threaten his ideals. On December 14, two days after gaining control of the ROK Army, Chun Doo-hwan began to appoint allies from the Korean Military Academy to powerful seats in the military to gain total control of the military forces of South Korea. For example, Roh Tae-woo, who would later become president of South Korea, was appointed commanding general of the Capital Security Command.

Chun Doo-Hwan continued to strengthen his power during the early months of 1980. Citizens of South Korea began a series of demonstrations, known as the Seoul Spring, to express their discontent. The Seoul Spring is a term that came from the Prague Spring of Czechoslovakia in 1968, and refers to the democratic and political liberation desires of the people of South Korea. Demonstrations from the citizens continued and reached its peak in mid-May 1980. The army was utilized to suppress the movement, using armed troops and armored vehicles. Despite the counter measures of the military, the center of Seoul was crowded with demonstrators on May 14th and more than one-hundred thousand students gathered in the front of Seoul Station.

Day of the coup 
Starting March 1980, with the government's continued implementation of the Yushin system, martial law, and the failure for the government to progress forward, citizen of South Korea, with the involvement of students being significant, came together to begin the Seoul Spring demonstrations. In addition, tensions rose even more as although South Korea had a president, Choi Kyu-hah, the real political authorities were held by Chun Doo-hwan and his group of officers. Demonstrations were intensified to call for an end to Chun Doo-hwan's rule. By May, the demonstrations became enormous and the center of Seoul was packed with those participating in the demonstrations. The government retaliated against the demonstrators by sending armed troops and armored vehicles. On May 17, 1980, Chun Doo-hwan declared Martial Law Decree No. 10, which strengthened martial law and expanded its reach across the whole nation. In addition, actions that would pose a threat to the government were restricted; such as public criticism from broadcasting and publications and political gatherings, also universities were closed and labor strikes were banned, and the demonstrations that yearned for a democracy were put to an end. In addition to the expansion of martial law, political figures were apprehended. These figures were; Kim Dae-jung, Kim Yong-sam, Kim Jong-pil and Yi Hu-rak. The coup of March 17 abruptly put an end to the Seoul Spring demonstrations and prolonged the period of authoritarian rule.

Martial law of 1980s South Korea 
The martial law that took place in South Korea during 1980s began in 1979 declared by General Chun Doo-hwan. Due to the enforcement of the martial law: South Korean universities were shut down, newspaper offices were closed, and any political activity that went against the policies of General Chun Doo-hwan were strictly banned. In further details, all public gatherings that included more than three party were forbidden with an only exception for funerals. With the Korean news media muzzled by martial law, only the handful of foreign correspondents present could publish reports on what was happening in Gwangju — no easy task, given the army cordon. Telephone lines had been cut by the military; some reporters walked miles to villages to line up at the nearest phones still working. Soon after, General Chun Doo-hwan broadened the terms of martial law into the entire country of South Korea and rigorously kept in check with suspicious activities that seemed to be promoting democracy. Thus all pro-democracy leaders including students were considered as traitors or anti-government criminals. In consequence, the charges that met those of who were considered as convicts were in reality as cruel as any major prisoners. Police squads were sent to guard and raid the homes of individuals that promoted rebellion against General Chun Doo-hwan as well as to the homes of university students, most notably Chonnam University in Gwangju. It was only then in March 1980 when restricted universities were reopened and suppressed individuals including professors and certain students were allowed to return to the universities. By May 21, up to 200,000 people were fighting against 100,000 troops. By Martial Law Command's own accounts demonstrators had commandeered 4 armored trucks, 80 jeeps, and 50 trucks. They also seized 3,500 carbines and pistols, 2 light machine guns, and more than 46,000 round of ammunition.

The role of the Shin-gun-bu (New Military Group) 
The rise of the Shin-gun-bu

While the collapse of the Yushin System came after the assassination of former president Park Chung-hee by the Korean Central Intelligence Agency (KCIA), the fall of a personal leader did not end military reign; instead the shin-gun-bu (often called the New Military Group) took the spot vacated by the former president. There were significant differences between Park's regime and the new regime, the most significant factor being that they played different roles as someone in the ruling position. Park's regime had positive impact on economic development and offered political stability for a nation that was just building; Chun Doo-hwan's regime on the other hand aimed to open up the political and economic system. As a result, hundreds of citizens were killed and eventually the regime lost it legitimacy.

Enforcing the martial law

On May 18th, the Shin-gun-bu, or the New Military Group, proclaimed Martial Law Decree No. 10 which banned political activities, closed universities by force, and censored the media in the country. This led to university students in Gwangju initiating an uprising known as the 5.18 movement. Students took up arms in the process but were crushed by armed forces and airborne troops sent by the Shin-gun-bu in order to enforce the martial law. On May 21st, citizens of Gwangju joined the protest demonstration and drove the armed forces out of the city, only to have them return on May 27th which led to a bloody suppression sometimes called "Sangmuchungjungjakjun". This event along with the 5.18 movement led by the leaders brought negative sentiment towards the regime among students and citizens.

Situation after the coup

Prelude to oppression 
On the night of May 17, 1980, 688 armed troops arrived at Gwangju and were deployed to National University of Gwangju which were Jeon-nam University and Joseon University. They were elite troops of the Shin-gun-bu, who had spent months focusing solely on fighting demonstrations. The universities of Gwangju region were occupied by the martial law army and many of the leaders of the Gwangju community and student movements were arrested. In this respect, the prelude to oppression rang and the Gwangju uprising erupted on the morning of May 18, 1980.

Code name "Splendid Holiday" - the beginning of a tragedy 
In front of the main gate of the university, fully armed troops were blocking access. Students who tried to enter the front gate to go to the library were beaten by airborne members, but the students did not give up easily. Soon after, more than 100 students began a sit-in on the bridge in front of the main gate after 10 a.m. Soon after, the number of students increased to 200 to 300, and they began shouting for "Cancellation of martial law", "Chun Doo-hwan out", and "Withdrawal of the closing order". The airborne troops rushed at them and began beating unarmed students with clubs. Students who had been repeatedly confronted with the airborne troops reassembled at the square of Gwangju station and walked across the public bus terminal and in front of the Catholic center, aiming to arrive at Jeon-nam provincial government. Nevertheless, airborne forces carried out a strong suppression against protest. Regardless of whether they joined the protest or not, young people were beaten with clubs. Around 7 p.m. near Gwangju High School in Gyerim-dong, hundreds of youths and students fought against airborne troops but were not enough. In front of the Catholic Center, about 600 students and citizens threw stones at airborne troops, but were disbanded within 10 minutes. On the afternoon of May 18, while searching for work downtown, Kim Kyung-chul happened upon a demonstration. Though not a participant, and unable to speak due to hearing difficulties, he was attacked and killed by three to four airborne troops armed with police sticks; marking the first fatality of the protests. Rumors about the atrocities of the airborne troops spread throughout Gwangju. There were 405 people who were brought to the police station and among them, 68 were reported to have suffered head injuries, bruises, and cuts, while 12 were listed as critical, however far more actual injuries occurred. The ministry changed the curfew to 9 p.m. and sent an additional airborne brigade to Gwangju. However, that evening, not a single word about Gwangju was mentioned on TV or radio. Sporadic demonstrations continued until late at night, and cries were heard everywhere.

Mass shooting on Gwangju citizens 
On May 21, 1980, many citizens gathered in Geumnam-ro and the airborne troops were confronting. The representatives of the civic group held negotiations with the martial law troop on the morning of May 21, but failed. South Choong-cheong Province Governor announced that he would withdraw the airborne troops by noon on Tuesday via a helicopter loudspeaker. However, the promise of the evacuation of the airborne troops was not kept, and the defensive troops began firing indiscriminately at the protesters, but the demonstrators did not give in. After the group fire, airborne forces went up to Jeonil building, Suhyup and Gwangju Tourist Hotel located in Geumnam-ro, in a group of four to shoot people and killed thousands of people. On that day, 120 hospitals, health centers and three general hospitals in Gwangju were crowded with casualties. The outskirts of Gwangju were blocked as well as phone calls to the city. 

Some far-right groups, such as Ilbe, dispute the occupation of provincial buildings by civilians.  Instead, they claim that participation and organization by North Korean agents led to the unrest. These claims are widely disavowed by historians and politicians.

The uprising of the Gwangju citizens 
From the afternoon of May 21, citizens began to arm themselves in order to protect themselves from the violence of the army. Citizens formed the militia in Naju, South Jeolla province by opening the reserve forces of police and police stations, carrying guns and arming them. Citizens rushed to Asia Motors' plant, the only car factory in Gwangju, and took their vehicles. Some members of militia drove 260 vehicles and traveled to Naju and Hwasoon to report the news of Gwangju. The weapons taken from various parts, including guns, live ammunition and explosives, were distributed among citizens. With the instruction from the upper class, the troops were retreated to the outskirts of Gwangju. In the evening of May 21, the militia occupied the provincial government of South Jeolla Province, where the martial law troops left. At the request of Chun Doo-hwan on 21st evening, Brigadier General Jeong Do-young delivered a statement to General Lee Hee-sung, commander of martial law, warning of invocation of right to self-defense. General Lee Hee-seong, commander of martial law, issued a statement warning of invocation to invoke the right to self-defense at 7 p.m. Lee Hee-sung named the protests in Gwangju as “Gwangju incident” and described it as a riot by impure elements and rioters.

The impact and evaluation of the event 
This democratic movement in Gwangju had a huge impact on Korea's democratic movement since the 1980s. It is also regarded as a decisive trigger for the development of democracy in Korea. It was an event that showed the will of the citizens of Korea for democracy, significantly weakening their position in the military, and the people's will to fight for democracy. In contemporary society, Koreans believe that sacrifice of Gwangju has helped to achieve democracy in Korea today. Moreover, films or dramas based on the incident were released and gained huge popularity as well as resentment of people.

References

See also 

 Gwangju Uprising
 Chun Doo-hwan
 Coup d'état of December Twelfth
 Park Chung-hee

Military coups in South Korea
1980s coups d'état and coup attempts
1980 in South Korea
Fourth Republic of Korea
Far-right politics in South Korea
Political repression in South Korea
Conflicts in 1980